Adaleafuen is a town in the central Hiran region of Somalia.

References
Adale Afuen

Populated places in Hiran, Somalia